Lars Grimsrud is an aerospace engineer and  performance automobile enthusiast who has become a celebrity amongst owners of carbureted Chevrolet Corvettes and GM muscle cars for his skill at tuning their engines.
 
Lars  Grimsrud was born in Norway. He makes a living in Aerospace Engineering and has a background in General Aviation. He was an instructor at the GM Training Center.

Grimsrud routinely travels from his home in Lafayette, Colorado, to hold technical seminars for ad hoc groups of Corvette forum members. He has been featured by The New York Times for his unique "Tuning for Beer" tuning tours and seminars, which have taken him to over a dozen cities in North America, and once to Europe.

Grimsrud was an original founder and president of the GTO Association of America (ref. Who's Who in the Midwest), and contributed technical articles as the editor of The Legend magazine. In addition to being in demand for these personal visits to groups of owners, who invite him to town for informal tuning sessions, he is widely quoted on hundreds of websites, has authored dozens of technical papers which are available at various websites on the Internet, and is also available to rebuild carburetors and distributors through the mail. His vehicles, work and technical articles have been featured by High Performance Pontiac Magazine, Musclecar Magazine, and by Musclecar Review.

References

External links
SVE Automotive Restoration
How to Install Your Chevy Distributor
How to Repair & Rebuild your Alternator
How to Adjust your Early C4 TPS and Idle Speed
How to Set Your Timing for Peak Performance 
Vacuum Ports: Manifold, Ported and Venturi Vacuum Explained

American automotive engineers
American people of Norwegian descent
American aerospace engineers
Living people
People from Lafayette, Colorado
Year of birth missing (living people)